One, But a Lion! (Swedish: En, men ett lejon!) is a 1940 Swedish comedy film directed by Gustaf Molander and starring Håkan Westergren, Annalisa Ericson and Marianne Aminoff.

The film's art direction was by Arne Åkermark.

Cast
 Håkan Westergren as Kurt Lejon  
 Annalisa Ericson as Camilla Storm  
 Marianne Aminoff as Linda Lejon  
 Fridtjof Mjøen as Harry Martin  
 Tollie Zellman as Mrs. Grönberg  
 Eric Abrahamsson as Mr. Eugene  
 Mimi Pollak as Miss Blom  
 Lill-Tollie Zellman as Miss Lisa 
 Olga Adamsén as Customer  
 Karin Alexandersson as Customer  
 Margit Andelius as Cigar girl  
 Gösta Bodin as Andersson  
 Tor Borong as Travelling man  
 Nils Dahlgren as Party guest  
 Eivor Engelbrektsson as Shop assistant  
 Britta Larsson as Party guest 
 Marianne Lenard as Guest  
 Walter Lindström as Policeman  
 Gösta Lycke as Head Waiter  
 Karin Nordgren as Guest  
 Greta Wenneberg as Guest  
 Lisa Wirström as Customer

References

Bibliography 
 Mariah Larsson & Anders Marklund. Swedish Film: An Introduction and Reader. Nordic Academic Press, 2010.

External links 
 

1940 films
1940 comedy films
Swedish comedy films
1940s Swedish-language films
Films directed by Gustaf Molander
Swedish black-and-white films
1940s Swedish films